HMS Attentive was one of two  scout cruisers built for the Royal Navy during the first decade of the 20th century. Completed in 1905 the ship was placed in reserve until she was commissioned in 1907 as part of the Home Fleet. She then spent the next seven years moving on and off of active service in British waters. The ship sank one destroyer and damaged two others in collisions. Attentive was assigned to coastal defence duties when the First World War began in 1914, and spent most of the war assigned to the Dover Patrol. She played a minor role in the Zeebrugge Raid in early 1918 and was then assigned to escort convoys to Gibraltar. The ship was sent to the White Sea later in the year to support the unsuccessful North Russia intervention in the Russian Civil War. Attentive paid off at the end of 1918 and was sold for scrap in 1920.

Design and description
The Adventure-class ships were one of four classes of scout cruisers ordered by the Admiralty. These ships were intended to work with destroyer flotillas, leading their torpedo attacks and backing them up when attacked by other destroyers, although they quickly became less useful as destroyer speeds increased before the First World War. Their crew consisted of 289 officers and ratings.

The ship was powered by a pair of three-cylinder triple-expansion steam engines, each driving one shaft, using steam provided by a dozen Yarrow boilers.

The main armament of the Adventure class consisted of ten quick-firing (QF) 12-pounder 18-cwt guns. Three guns were mounted abreast on the forecastle and the quarterdeck, with the remaining four guns positioned port and starboard amidships. They also carried eight 3-pounder Hotchkiss guns and two above-water 18-inch (450 mm) torpedo tubes, one on each broadside. T

Construction and career
Attentive was laid down by Armstrong Whitworth at their yards at Elswick shipyard on 8 January 1904 as yard number 748 and launched on 24 November. After completion in October 1905, the ship was placed in reserve; two additional 12-pounder guns were added and the 3-pounder guns were replaced with six QF 6-pounder Hotchkiss guns not long afterwards. She was commissioned in March 1907 for service with the Nore Division of the Home Fleet. On 7 August 1907 (one source states it occurred on 6 August) she collided with the destroyer , badly damaging Quails bow. The following year, on 27 April 1908, Attentive was involved in a series of accidents during a live-firing exercise at night with the Eastern Destroyer Flotilla. She accidentally rammed and sank the destroyer , killing one crewman. The hapless Attentive then collided with the destroyer , holing her hull.

After repairs she was recommissioned at Chatham in July 1909 and became leader of the 3rd Destroyer Flotilla, then joined the 2nd Destroyer Flotilla in 1910. About 1911–1912, her main guns were replaced by nine  guns, arranged four on each broadside and the remaining gun on the quarterdeck. After refit in August 1912 at HM Dockyard, Devonport, Attentive was assigned to the 3rd Light Cruiser Squadron in 1913 for the annual manoeuvres and was then transferred to lead the 9th Destroyer Flotilla at Portsmouth. The ship joined the 6th Destroyer Flotilla at Dover later that year. During the Curragh incident of 1914 the ship was deployed to Ireland with the HMS Pathfinder, and First Lord of the Admiralty Winston Churchill threatened to "pour enough shot and shell into Belfast to reduce it to ruins" if the Ulster Volunteers revolted against the British Armed Forces.

She spent most of the First World War as part of the Dover Patrol. On 7 September 1915 she became an early victim of air power. While supporting a naval bombardment of German positions at Ostend, Attentive was bombed, suffering eight casualties. The air attack forced the squadron to briefly disperse, before returning to carry out the bombardment. Attentive screened the raiding force during the Zeebrugge Raid on 25 April 1918 and recovered part of the ship's crew of the concrete-filled cruiser  after she had detonated her demolition charges. Later that year the ship began escorting convoys to Gibraltar. She spent a few months off Murmansk, North Russia, supporting British forces intervening in the Russian Civil War. Attentive was paid off in December 1918, after hostilities ended, and was sold for scrap in April 1920.

Notes

Citations

Bibliography

External links

 Transcribed logbooks August 1917 to December 1918
 Adventure class in World War I
 History of the Adventure class
 The Adventure class

 

Adventure-class cruisers
World War I cruisers of the United Kingdom
1904 ships
Ships built by Armstrong Whitworth
Ships built on the River Tyne
Maritime incidents in 1907
Maritime incidents in 1908
Maritime incidents in 1915